Festuclavine is an ergoline fungal isolate.

See also
 Festuclavine dehydrogenase

Notes

Ergolines
Alkaloids found in fungi
Ergot alkaloids